Liaquat Ali Asim (1951–2019) was a Pakistani Urdu language poet and linguist who served in Urdu Dictionary Board from 1980 to 2011, and retired as editor of the Board.

Biography
Asim was born in Manora Island, Karachi on 14 August 1951. He was one of the youngest of his 8 brothers and 1 sister. He belonged to the Konkani community. He was a Konkani Muslim.

He worked for the Urdu Dictionary Board for three decades. Total eight collections of his poetry have been published, which include Sabd-e-Gul (1977), Āngan Meiṉ Samandar (1988), Raqs-e-Wisāl (1996), Nasheeb-e-Shahar (2008), Dil Kharashī (2011), Bāġh To Sārā Jānā Hai (2013), Nesh-e-Ishq (2017) and Mere Kutbe Pe Uskā Naam Likho (2019). Asim was suffering from cancer.

He died on 29 June 2019 in Karachi due to gallbladder cancer.

References

1951 births
2019 deaths
People from Karachi
Urdu-language poets from Pakistan
Poets from Karachi
Linguists of Urdu
Konkani Muslims
Deaths from cancer in Pakistan
Deaths from gallbladder cancer